C-type lectin domain family 9 member A is a protein that in humans is encoded by the CLEC9A gene.

Function

CLEC9A is a group V C-type lectin-like receptor (CTLR) that functions as an activation receptor and is expressed on myeloid lineage cells (Huysamen et al., 2008 [PubMed 18408006]).

References

Further reading

External links 
 PDBe-KB provides an overview of all the structure information available in the PDB for Human C-type lectin domain family 9 member A  (CLEC9A)